Egg tossing or egg throwing is a game associated with Easter. Various types of such games exist, common ones involve throwing an egg so that it lands on the ground without breaking. Such a contest may be known as an egg toss.

The egg was a symbol of the rebirth of the earth in Pagan celebrations of spring and was adopted by early Christians as a symbol of the rebirth of man at Easter.

History
In medieval Britain there was an egg throwing festival held in the churches at Easter. The priest would give out one hard-boiled egg which was tossed around the nave of the church and the choirboy who was holding the egg when the clock struck twelve would get to keep it.

In one version of the game the idea is to toss an egg so it falls on the ground without breaking. This is possible on, for example, grassy meadows. In Germany, children invented a way to spin the egg during the toss so that it lands on its tip still spinning.

Dutch children play a game called "egg sales" in which one child sells an egg to another. The new owner then throws the egg in the grass and if it does not break it must be returned to the seller.

Gameplay
Egg tossing is also known as a team competition with basically the following rules, although the exact details may vary. One member of a two-person team  tosses an egg to another. If the egg does not break, they step apart and the toss is repeated. The contest continues until one egg is left unbroken. (A popular variation uses water balloons.)

Records

On July 4, 2011, in Grangeville, Idaho, the world record for the number of persons participating in an egg toss was set, with 2,130 persons participating.

An egg throwing feat was recorded in the Guinness Book of World Records: on November 12, 1978, Johnny Dell Foley successfully tossed a fresh hen's egg for a distance of 323 ft 2in (98.51m) to a Keith Thomas at Jewett, Texas. The record was undefeated until at least 1999. Since 2000 the feat is no longer listed in the book.

Since the world record in Egg Throwing has not been recorded in the Guinness Book of World Records since 1999, the World Egg Throwing Federation, based in Swaton, England, now certifies official world records. The world record in Egg Throwing was held until May 19, 2013 by the Dutchmen Andries Smink and Hillebrand Visser with a certified distance of throw and catch of 69.5 meters (228.01837 ft) thrown on August 17, 2012. May 19, 2013 the Irish 'Wild' Willie O'Donevan and 'Big' Warren McElhone set a new world record at the Irish National Open of 71.2 meters.

WETF World Records:
 During the Dutch Open Egg Throwing championship, July 9, 2012, The Dutchmen Andries Smink (catcher) and Hillebrand Visser set an official WETF World Record at 61.50 meters
 On August 7, 2012 Andries Smink and Hillebrand Visser broke their own WETF World record and set it 69.25 meters
 A WETF World Record was set on May 19, 2013, during the Open Irish Eggthrowing at Ballinrobe, when "Wild" Willie O'Donovan (tosser) and Warren Mc Elhone (catcher) overcame a distance of 71.2 meters.
 During the Dutch Open Eggthrowing Championships, July 13, 2013 the world record was taken back by the Dutch, Andries Smink and Allard Adema covered a distance of 73.77 meters.
 A new official WETF World Record was set on May 23, 2014 by the brothers Andries and Bauke Jetze Smink, at 76.27 meters (250.22 ft).
 The WETF World Record was taken from the Smink brothers during WETF World Championships 2017 on June 25 by the New Zealand team Robbie Hollander and Nick Hornstein with a distance of 81 meters (265.74 feet).
 The Hollander/Hornstein world record was broken on March 11, 2018 by Ricki Paewai and Kris Richards with a throw and catch at 85.96 meters.

The Hagerstown Suns have hosted the annual National Egg Toss Championship since 2005.

A World Egg Throwing Federation championship is held in Swaton, England each year on the last Sunday in June since 2006.

See also 
Egg rolling
Egg tapping
Egg dance
Egg hunt
Pace Egg play

References

Easter egg
Traditional Easter games
Competitions